Neihuang County is a county in the north of Henan province, China, bordering Hebei province to the north. It is under the administration of Anyang city.

Administrative divisions
As 2012, this county is divided to 7 towns and 10 townships.
Towns

Townships

Climate

References

County-level divisions of Henan
Anyang